Michael Murphy is an American politician and retired pilot serving as a member of the Kansas House of Representatives from the 114th district. Elected in November 2020, he assumed office on January 11, 2021.

Early life and education 
Murphy was born in Miami, Oklahoma. He graduated from the Ross School of Aviation in 1978.

Career 
Murphy worked as a pilot for United Airlines from 1990 to 2007. Since retiring, Murphy has operated the Prairie Oaks Inn in Sylvia, Kansas. He also writes opinion articles and hosts a radio show called The Voice of Reason. He was elected to the Kansas House of Representatives in November 2018 and assumed office in January 2021.

References 

Living people
People from Miami, Oklahoma
United Airlines people
Republican Party members of the Kansas House of Representatives
Year of birth missing (living people)